Hortia is a genus of sea snails, marine gastropod molluscs in the family Pyramimitridae, the mitre snails.

Species
Species within the genus Hortia include:
 Hortia aotearoa Kantor, Lozouet, Puillandre & Bouchet, 2014
 † Hortia arriuensis Lozouet, 1999 
 Hortia macrocephala Kantor, Lozouet, Puillandre & Bouchet, 2014
 Hortia marshalli Kantor, Lozouet, Puillandre & Bouchet, 2014
 Hortia paradrillia Kantor, Lozouet, Puillandre & Bouchet, 2014
 Hortia pseudotaranis Kantor, Lozouet, Puillandre & Bouchet, 2014
 Hortia solitaria Kantor, Lozouet, Puillandre & Bouchet, 2014
 Hortia spenceri Kantor, Lozouet, Puillandre & Bouchet, 2014

References

 Lozouet P. (1999). Nouvelles espèces de gastéropodes (Mollusca: Gastropoda) de l'Oligocène et du Miocène inférieur d'Aquitaine (sud-ouest de la France). Partie 2. Cossmanniana. 6: 1-68.
 Kantor Y., Lozouet P., Puillandre N. & Bouchet P. (2014) Lost and found: The Eocene family Pyramimitridae (Neogastropoda) discovered in the Recent fauna of the Indo-Pacific. Zootaxa 3754(3): 239–276

Pyramimitridae
Gastropod genera